Armando Conceição Freitas (born 24 July 1992 in Praia) is a Cape Verdean footballer  who plays for Marítimo B as a defender.

Football career
On 12 August 2012, Freitas made his professional debut with Marítimo B in a 2012–13 Segunda Liga match against Leixões.

References

External links
 
Stats and profile at LPFP 

1992 births
Living people
Cape Verdean footballers
Association football defenders
Liga Portugal 2 players
C.S. Marítimo players
Sportspeople from Praia